Richard Payl (Pawlie, Payli, Paylus or Pulley) was a 15th-century Dominican friar. He served firstly as the Bishop of Dromore before becoming the Bishop of Mann and The Isles.

He was appointed the bishop of the Diocese of Dromore by Pope Gregory XII on 30 December 1407 and was consecrated sometime before 11 November 1408. According to some publications, he was recorded as Richard Messing and which said he died in 1409. It may be there is some confusion with Richard Misyn, O.Carm., probably a later bishop of Dromore.

Payl was translated to the bishoprics of Mann and The Isles by Antipope John XXIII on 30 May 1410. He was recognised as bishop of the Isles until c. 1421 and was still recognised bishop on the Isle of Man until c. 1429–1433.

References

Bibliography

 
  
 
 

 
 
 
 

 
 

 
 
 

15th-century Roman Catholic bishops in Ireland
Roman Catholic bishops of Dromore
Bishops of the Isles
Bishops of Sodor and Man
Dominican bishops
Year of birth unknown
Year of death unknown
15th-century Scottish Roman Catholic bishops